The Order of the Heroic Exemplar was the second highest military decoration, during 2011 and 2018, awarded by the Government of the People's Republic of China, only lower than the Order of August First, and was named Heroic Exemplar Medal before 2011. The person who gained the award is called Heroic Exemplar.

According to the 2018 amendment of PLA Disciplinary Order, the First Class Order of Heroic Exemplar is renamed back to Heroic Exemplar Medal, and the Second Class Order is abandoned.

History 
The Heroic Exemplar Medal, along with the Meritorious Service Medal, was first created in April 1951 by the Chinese People's Volunteer Army political director Du Ping in an effort to promote the unity of the Chinese armed forces during the Korean War. The medal was conceived so that the common soldiers would follow the examples set by a few selected role models. When the medal was first created, it was composed of three categories — second, first and special class. The special class was later eliminated when the Chinese People's Liberation Army's (PLA) medal system was formalized in 1988. In 2011, the name of the award changed into Order of Heroic Exemplar.

Criteria and selection process 
According to the initial award criteria published in 1951, the medal of the Order was awarded to those "who have owned two medals of third or second class or one of the first grade [Meritorious Service] award, who are most outstanding at an army or army corps level, and whose remarkable contribution are also recognized by friendly units."

A candidate for the order would normally be nominated by the deputy political officer of a company, while all squads within the company were required to meet once a month to list each soldier's accomplishments for the selection process. Once nominated, the Political Work Department of the Central Military Commission or the candidate's theater region political department would be responsible for approving the nomination to the order. Before 2018 the nomination process for a prospective inductee included what class of the order he or she will be appointed to.

Investiture and regulations for wear 
Once the nomination is approved, the recipient would be treated with a grand formal ceremony of investiture that is intended to educate the entire PLA or the recipient's military theater command, wherein he or she is formally invested with the medal of the Order. Besides the medal, the recipient also receives a ribbon bar and a certificate from the Political Work Department of the Central Military Commission. Until 2018 the certificate of honor indicated which  class of the order in which he or she has been named to was to be stated. According to the 1988 regulation, the medal of the Order must be worn on the upper left side of the recipient's uniform. The regulation also decreed that the medal itself can only be worn during special meetings and celebrations, while the ribbon bars are allowed in daily functions.

Recipient

First Class Order of Heroic Exemplar 
From the renaming of the award in 2011, to the end of December 2016, a total of 14 people have received the First Class Medal of the Order of Heroic Exemplar, including 2 general officers, 7 field and junior grade officers, and 1 private. Of the 14 recipients, 4 of them are posthumously awarded.

Second Class Order of Heroic Exemplar
Not all individuals who received the Second Class Order of Heroic Exemplar were reported in the public media.

Notes

References

Citations

Sources 

 

Awards established in 1951
Military awards and decorations of China
Military awards and decorations of the People's Liberation Army
People's Volunteer Army
1951 establishments in China
Hero (title)